In enzymology, an UDP-N-acetylglucosamine 6-dehydrogenase is an enzyme that catalyzes the chemical reaction

UDP-N-acetyl-D-glucosamine + 2 NAD+ + H2O  UDP-N-acetyl-2-amino-2-deoxy-D-glucuronate + 2 NADH + 2 H+

The 3 substrates of this enzyme are UDP-N-acetyl-D-glucosamine, NAD+, and H2O, whereas its 3 products are UDP-N-acetyl-2-amino-2-deoxy-D-glucuronate, NADH, and H+.

This enzyme belongs to the family of oxidoreductases, specifically those acting on the CH-OH group of donor with NAD+ or NADP+ as acceptor. The systematic name of this enzyme class is UDP-N-acetyl-D-glucosamine:NAD+ 6-oxidoreductase. Other names in common use include uridine diphosphoacetylglucosamine dehydrogenase, UDP-acetylglucosamine dehydrogenase, UDP-2-acetamido-2-deoxy-D-glucose:NAD oxidoreductase, and UDP-GlcNAc dehydrogenase. This enzyme participates in aminosugars metabolism.

References

 

EC 1.1.1
NADH-dependent enzymes
Enzymes of unknown structure